Fogler is a surname. People having this surname include:

Raymond H. Fogler (1892–1996), United States Assistant Secretary of the Navy
Dan Fogler (born 1976), American actor, comedian and writer
Eddie Fogler (born 1948), American retired college basketball player and coach
Bartłomiej Fogler (born 1985), Polish footballer
William H. Fogler (1837–1902), Justice of the Maine Supreme Judicial Court

See also
Raymond H. Fogler Library, academic library at the University of Maine